The Socialist Party of Illinois (SPIL) is a political party in the state of Illinois. It was affiliated with the Socialist Party of America. It was founded in September 1901, though the grouping met in 1900 at a convention in Chicago and supported Eugene V. Debs for president in 1900. It was the successor to the Social Democratic Party of America.

In 1915, the party had 6,004 members. 44 party members held public office in that year, including one mayor, 18 aldermen and 2 members of the Illinois House of Representatives among others. The Chicago Socialist was the newspaper of the Socialist Party of Illinois.

The Chicago Socialist Party was the most active local in the SPIL and one of the most active in the United States. It is now an affiliate of the Socialist Party USA.

Presidential nominee results
From 1904 to 1948, the SPIL placed its nominee for president on the Illinois ballot. In 1952 and 1956, the party's nominee was not on the ballot, nor has the party placed the SPUSA nominee on the ballot since it began running candidates again in 1976.

Notable members
 Roy E. Burt, National Secretary and 1932 candidate for governor
 Adolph Germer, National Secretary and multi-time candidate
 Charles H. Kerr, Party Secretary (1902)
 George Ross Kirkpatrick, SPA vice-presidential nominee and 1928 nominee for United States Senate
 Maynard C. Krueger, 1940 nominee for vice-president
 Christian M. Madsen, member of the Illinois House of Representatives from 1913 to 1917.
 Joseph Mason, member of the Illinois House of Representatives from 1913 to 1917.
 Thomas J. Morgan, labor leader and multi-time candidate
 Algie Martin Simons, newspaper editor
 Seymour Stedman, attorney and 1920 vice-presidential nominee

References

Political parties established in 1901
Illinois
Illinois
 
Socialism in Illinois